The Great Seal of North Carolina is used to authenticate certain documents issued by the Government of North Carolina. The Great Seal was modified to its present form in 1983.

Design
According to an act passed by the North Carolina General Assembly on April 8, 1971, and amended in 1983:

"The background on the seal shall contain a depiction of mountains running from the left to the right to the middle of the seal. A side view of a three-masted ship shall be located on the ocean and to the right of Plenty. The date "May 20, 1775" shall appear within the seal and across the top of the seal and the words "esse quam videri" shall appear at the bottom around the perimeter. No other words, figures or other embellishments shall appear on the seal

History
In 1971, the seal was officially adopted after the state's chief deputy attorney general discovered that there was more than one version in use. In 1983, state senator Julian R. Allsbrook proposed a revision to the seal to add to the seal the date April 12, 1776, the date of the Halifax Resolves; this revision was approved by the state legislature. These two dates are also on the flag of North Carolina.

Seals of North Carolina
The seal of the region changed over time.

See also

Flag of North Carolina
List of North Carolina state symbols

References

Further reading

External links 

 

Great Seal
Plants in art
Ships in art
Symbols introduced in 1971
Great Seal
United States state seals
Women in art